This is a list of Buddhist temples, monasteries, stupas, and pagodas in Singapore for which there are Wikipedia articles.

 Amitabha Buddhist Centre
 Buddha of Medicine Welfare Society
 Buddha Tooth Relic Temple and Museum
 Buddhist Library
 Burmese Buddhist Temple
 Cheng Beng Buddhist Society
 Foo Hai Ch'an Monastery
 Hai Inn Temple
 Hua Giam Si
 Jin Long Si Temple
 Karma Kagyud Buddhist Centre
 Kong Meng San Phor Kark See Monastery
 Kwan Im Thong Hood Cho Temple
 Kwan Yin Chan Lin
 Lian Shan Shuang Lin Monastery
 Palelai Buddhist Temple
 Poh Ern Shih Temple
 Sakya Muni Buddha Gaya Temple
 Sri Lankaramaya Buddhist Temple
 Thekchen Choling
 Ti-Sarana Buddhist Association
 Tzu Chi Singapore
 Vipassana Meditation Centre
 Wat Ananda Metyarama Thai Buddhist Temple

See also
 Buddhism in Singapore
 List of Buddhist temples

Notes

External links

 BuddhaNet's Comprehensive Directory of Buddhist Temples sorted by country
 Buddhactivity Dharma Centres database

 
Singapore
Singapore
Buddhist temples